Ernesto Flores Filho was a Brazilian rowing coxswain. He competed in the men's coxed four event at the 1920 Summer Olympics.

References

External links
 

Year of birth missing
Year of death missing
Brazilian male rowers
Olympic rowers of Brazil
Rowers at the 1920 Summer Olympics
Place of birth missing
Coxswains (rowing)